The 14th Bersaglieri Battalion "Sernaglia" is an inactive battalion of the Italian Army's infantry corps' Bersaglieri speciality. Raised as XIV Bersaglieri Battalion in 1859 the battalion became autonomous on 15 April 1977 and received the flag and traditions of the 5th Bersaglieri Regiment.

History

Formation 
The XIV Bersaglieri Battalion was raised in 1859 and immediately distinguished itself in the during the Siege of Ancona and Siege of Gaeta in 1860, earning two Bronze Medals of Military Valour. On 24 January 1861 the battalion entered the newly raised 5th Bersaglieri Regiment.

World War I 

During World War I the regiment fought on the Italian front, where the regiment during the Battle of Vittorio Veneto managed to cross the Piave river and break the Austro-Hungarian front line at Sernaglia after five days of brutal combat.

World War II 

On 7 April 1939 the XIV Battalion landed in Durrës in Albania as part of the Italian invasion of Albania. Meanwhile on 20 April 1939 the regiment joined the newly raised 131st Armored Division "Centauro". On 28 October of the same year the division was transferred to Albania for the Greco-Italian War. In December 1942 the 5th Bersaglieri Regiment was transferred to Tunisia for the Tunisian campaign. Regiment and battalion fought at the battles of Kasserine Pass, Mareth Line, and El Guettar. The remnants of regiment and battalion surrendered with the rest of Army Group Africa on 13 May 1943.

Cold War 
With the 1975 army reform divisions received their own recruits training battalions and on 15 April 1977 the Detachment of the 16th Infantry (Recruits Training) Battalion "Savona" in Albegna was renamed 14th Bersaglieri (Recruits Training) Battalion "Sernaglia", which received the flag and traditions of the 5th Bersaglieri Regiment. The battalion trained recruits destined for the Bersaglieri battalions of the Armored Division "Ariete". When the division was disbanded in 1986 the battalion passed to the Northwestern Military Region.

With the end of the Cold War the Italian Army began to downsize its forces and the on 30 December 1989 the "Sernaglia" battalion was disbanded and the war flag of the 5th Bersaglieri Regiment was transferred to the Shrine of the Flags in the Vittoriano in Rome.

See also 
 Bersaglieri

References

Bersaglieri Battalions of Italy